Yanja was one of the Manchu clans belonging to the Plain Yellow Banner.

Notable figures

Males 
 Zhaotu (兆图), a jiduwei
 Tana (塔纳), a yunjiwei
 Tuzhu (图珠), a third class qingche duwei
 Andali
 Buyantai (布彦泰; 1791–1880), served as a General of Ili, second rank military official and Viceroy of Shaan-Gan in 1845
 Jinglian (景廉,1823-1885), served as a vice commander of Manchu Bordered Red Banner in 1852, a fourth rank literary official of the ministry of Personnel and ministry of Justice, a General of Ili in 1858, Imperial Commissioner in 1875 and a member of Council of State
 Dingcheng (定成), a sixth rank literary official in 1884,  an official in the ministry of Justice in 1886, an examiner of the Ministry of Justice in 1889, a magistrate of Yizhou in 1899, a master of ceremonies in 1906 and Vice Minister of Justice in 1911.
 Yuxian (毓贤;1842–1901), known for organisation of Taiyuan massacre as a governor of Shanxi

Females 
Princess Consort
 Secondary Consort
 Yujuan (1845–1881), Yixuan's secondary consort

 Concubine
 Hong Taiji's concubine, the mother of Yebušu (1627–1690)

References 

Manchu clans
Plain Yellow Banner